Customs Department of Lithuania is the customs department under the Ministry of Finance. It is a part of the customs system of the European Union.

History 
History of customs and tariff collection in Lithuania dates back to 11-13th centuries, when the Kingdom of Lithuania and later Grand Duchy of Lithuania began trading with the European
states. Vytautas the Great centralised the customs service in early 15th century. In modern Lithuania, the customs department was first established on 8 May 1919 as the Customs Department, at that time, under the Ministry of Trade and Industry.
The institution in its current form was restored on 9 October 1990.

Customs Department of Lithuania is a member of the World Customs Organization since 1992. Since Lithuania joined the EU, the department also closely cooperates with EU DG TAXUD and the European Anti-Fraud Office.

See also 
 European Union Customs Union
 General Agreement on Tariffs and Trade
 Taxation

References

External links
Official site

Government agencies of Lithuania
Law enforcement in Lithuania
Customs services
Taxation in Lithuania